Fred Jarrett is a member of the Washington State Public Disclosure Commission. His appointment to the commission, announced in April 2019 by Washington Governor Jay Inslee, noted that he had recently retired as Senior Deputy of the King County Executive, which he joined with the incoming administration of Dow Constantine in 2010. Jarrett was elected in 2008 as a Democratic member of the Washington State Senate, and represented the 41st district from January 2009 to the time he joined Constantine's administration. He announced that he would run for the State Senate in December 2007 after switching his political party affiliation. Prior to that election, he served in the Washington House of Representatives as a Republican for four terms, starting in 2001. His switch in political party affiliation at the time was noted as an example of "[t]he loss of GOP power in the affluent suburbs [that] has been one of the state’s major post-millennial political trends." Earlier in his political career, Jarrett was a member of the Mercer Island City Council, which he joined in 1978, serving as mayor for two terms in the 1980s.

References

External links
Washington State Legislature - Sen. Fred Jarrett
Project Vote Smart - Senator Fred Jarrett (WA)
Follow the Money - Fred Jarrett
2006 2004 2002 2000 1996 campaign contributions

Members of the Washington House of Representatives
Washington (state) state senators
Living people
People from Mercer Island, Washington
Seattle University alumni
Washington (state) Democrats
Washington (state) Republicans
Year of birth missing (living people)